ZMD may refer to:

 Zentralrat der Muslime in Deutschland - Islamic federation in Germany, see Central Council of Muslims in Germany
 ZENworks Management Daemon, an agent application for installing, updating and removing software
 Zentrum Mikroelektronik Dresden, semiconductor manufacturer based in Dresden, 1987 – 2015
 ZMD: Zombies of Mass Destruction (comics), 2008 comic-book series by Kevin Grevioux
 ZMD: Zombies of Mass Destruction (film), 2010 zombie comedy film by Kevin Hamedani